Margaret Trabue Hodgen (1890 – 22 January 1977) was an American sociologist and author.

Life 
Hodgen  was a professor of sociology at the University of California, Berkeley. Hodgen wrote the highly influential Doctrine of the Survivals, first published as a book in 1936, but originally launched in the journal American Anthropology in 1931.   

Hodgen completed her doctoral thesis, Workers' Education in England and the United States in 1925.

Publications
 Workers' education in England & the United States, London, K. Paul, Trench, Trubner & Co. 1925.
 Change and history : a study of the dated distributions of technological innovations in England, New York, Johnson 1952.
 Early Anthropology in the Sixteenth and Seventeenth Centuries, Philadelphia, Pa University of Pennsylvania Press 1964.
 Anthropology, history, and cultural change, Tucson, University of Arizona Press 1974.

References

1890 births
1977 deaths
American sociologists
American women sociologists
University of California, Berkeley College of Letters and Science faculty
University of California, Berkeley alumni